Morellet is a surname. Notable people with the surname include:

André Morellet (1727–1819), French economist writer and contributor to the Encyclopédie ou Dictionnaire raisonné des sciences
François Morellet (1926–2016), French contemporary painter, sculptor, and light artist

See also
11950 Morellet, an outer main-belt asteroid